Neogerris is a genus of water striders in the family Gerridae. There are about 13 described species in Neogerris.

Species
These 13 species belong to the genus Neogerris:

 Neogerris assimilis Andersen, 1975
 Neogerris boninensis Matsumura, 1913
 Neogerris celeris (Drake & Harris, 1934)
 Neogerris genticus (Drake & Harris, 1934)
 Neogerris hesione (Kirkaldy, 1902)
 Neogerris kontos Nieser, 1994
 Neogerris lotus (White, 1879)
 Neogerris lubricus (White, 1879)
 Neogerris magnus (Kuitert, 1942)
 Neogerris parvulus (Stål, 1859)
 Neogerris philippinensis Zettel, 2004-01
 Neogerris severini (Kirkaldy, 1900)
 Neogerris visendus (Drake & Harris, 1934)

References

Further reading

External links

 

Gerrini
Gerromorpha genera